Roped was a 1919 American Western-comedy film directed by John Ford and featuring Harry Carey. The film is considered to be lost. Roped is one of at least 25 films in which director John Ford and actor Harry Carey collaborated on between the years of 1917 and 1921. Ford saw Carry as a mentor and their worked on the story ideas for several of their films together.

During these collaborations, Carey made more per film then Ford. By 1919, the year Roped came out, Ford was making 300 dollars a week, Carey was making 1,250.  This differential in pay led to tension between the two.

Plot
Cheyenne Harry is a wealth ranch owner.  After his cowboys put an ad in the newspaper trying to find him a wife,  Harry marries Aileen Judson-Brown.  A year into their marriage, Aileen gives birth to their first child.  The new family live with Aileen’s status seeking mother, Mrs. Judson-Brown. Mrs. Judson-Brown tries everything in her power to break up the marriage so her daughter can marry the wealthier Ferdie Van Duzen. Mrs. Judson-Brown steals Harry and Aileen’s baby and tells Harry that Aileen no longer loves him and their baby has died. Heart broken, Harry moves out west.

Harry receives news from Mrs. Judson-Brown’s butler that his baby is still alive.  Harry finds his child and Aileen confesses her true love. The film ends with the reunited family heading West together, leaving Harry’s hateful mother-in-law behind.

Cast
 Harry Carey as Cheyenne Harry
 Neva Gerber as Aileen
 Mollie McConnell as Mrs. Judson-Brown (as Molly McConnell)
 Arthur Shirley as Ferdie Van Duzen
 J. Farrell MacDonald as Butler

See also
 Harry Carey filmography
 John Ford filmography
 List of lost films

References

External links
 

1919 films
1910s Western (genre) comedy films
1919 lost films
1919 comedy films
American black-and-white films
Films directed by John Ford
Lost Western (genre) comedy films
Universal Pictures films
Lost American films
Silent American Western (genre) comedy films
1910s American films
1910s English-language films